This is a list of content libraries and catalogs that are owned by Warner Bros. Discovery.

Content libraries

Warner Bros.

Warner Bros. Pictures Group 
 Warner Bros. Pictures library (post-1949) (including DC Studios and Warner Animation Group) with a few exceptions owned by third-party companies
 Seven Arts Productions
 Seven Arts Television
 National General Pictures film library, plus Tarzan (excluding Cinema Center Films owned by Paramount Pictures)
 Orion Pictures (pre-1982)
 Lorimar Motion Pictures library (1978–1990) with some exceptions including all the pre-1978 films
 Monogram Pictures/Allied Artists Pictures Corporation library (1943–1979) (some pre-1947 films owned by Metro-Goldwyn-Mayer)
 The Geffen Film Company, except for Beavis and Butt-Head Do America owned by Paramount Pictures
 Warner Independent Pictures
 Warner Premiere 
 Dark Castle Entertainment film library (pre-2012)
 RatPac-Dune Entertainment film library (2013–2018), only movies co-produced and co-financed with Warner Bros. Pictures, plus Zack Snyder's Justice League
 Distribution rights to The Saul Zaentz Company film library (pre-1991)
 United States distribution rights to the Samuel Goldwyn Productions library (1923–1959) except for The Hurricane, owned by Metro-Goldwyn Mayer, and films in the public domain
 International distribution rights to most Morgan Creek Entertainment film library pre-2011, plus The Exorcist III and Ace Ventura: Pet Detective
 International theatrical and home video distribution rights to Metro-Goldwyn-Mayer film library (post-April 1986)
Turner Entertainment Co.
 Metro-Goldwyn-Mayer film library (pre-May 1986)
 Material from MGM's predecessors (Metro Pictures, Goldwyn Pictures, and Louis B. Mayer Pictures) post-1915 that did not enter the public domain
 MGM Television library (pre-1985), excluding the 1964–1967 Flipper series and Fame, owned by MGM themselves
 MGM Cartoons library (1934–1958, 1961–1967)
 United Artists/Associated Artists Productions libraries:
 Gilligan's Island and its animated spin-offs, The New Adventures of Gilligan and Gilligan's Planet
 Warner Bros. Pictures library (pre-1950) except films that are either in the public domain or owned by third-party companies
 First National Pictures
 Warner Bros. Cartoons library (pre-August 1948 color cartoons, plus Bugs Bunny: Superstar)
 Fleischer Studios/Famous Studios Popeye cartoons (1933–1957)
 RKO Pictures library (pre-1959) (US, Canadian, Latin America, European, and Australian distribution rights), except co-productions and films owned by third-party companies or fallen in the public domain
 Brut Productions
 Particular Crowd film library (pre-2023)
 Turner Pictures
 Discovery Films
 New Line Cinema (including 2005–08 Picturehouse films)
 New Line Television
 Fine Line Features
 Castle Rock Entertainment film library (pre-2010) (home entertainment rights to pre-1994 films held by MGM via Orion Pictures, and A Few Good Men, In the Line of Fire, and North are owned by Columbia Pictures)
 Castle Rock Entertainment television library, including ancillary rights to Seinfeld, which is distributed by Sony Pictures Television

Cable News Network, Inc. 
 CNN Originals
 CNN Films
 HLN Originals

Home Box Office, Inc. 
 HBO (including most HBO Documentary Films and programs produced for Cinemax)
 HBO Films
 HBO Independent Productions
 HBO Latin America Originals
 HBO Downtown Productions (pre-1992)
 Time-Life Films (pre-1986)
 The March of Time
 Talent Associates (except East Side/West Side owned by MGM Studios, McMillan & Wife owned by NBCUniversal , and most series co-produced with CBS Productions owned by Paramount Global)
 Magnolia Network

Television Networks and Studios 
 Warner Bros. Television Studios
 Alloy Entertainment
 Warner Horizon Scripted Television/Warner Horizon Unscripted Television
 Telepictures
 Turner Program Services
 Rankin/Bass Productions (post-1973)
 Lorimar Television
 The Wolper Organization library (post-1970)
 Cartoon Network Studios, including Williams Street (except Star Wars: The Clone Wars (2003), owned by The Walt Disney Company via Lucasfilm, and Transformers: Animated owned by Hasbro)
 CN LA Original Productions
 Warner Bros. Animation 
 Warner Bros. Cartoons library (B&W and post-July 1948 cartoons)
 Blue Ribbon Content
 Hanna-Barbera (with some exceptions for licensed properties)
 Ruby-Spears Enterprises (pre-1990)
 Warner Bros. Discovery Networks (including Discovery Channel, TLC, Animal Planet, Discovery Life, HGTV, Travel Channel, Food Network, Discovery Family, Cartoon Network, TruTV, and other networks)
 Warner Bros. International Television Production
 Warner Bros. Television Studios UK
 Shed Media
 Renegade Pictures
 Ricochet
 Twenty Twenty
 Wall to Wall Media
 All3Media (50% stake)
 Hanna-Barbera Studios Europe
 LazyTown Entertainment (except LazyTown Extra owned by BBC Studios) 
 Eyeworks
 Eyeworks UK
 Eyeworks Touchdown
 Eyeworks Cuatro Cabezas
 Eyeworks Egmond
 Eyeworks Brazil

DC Entertainment 
 Absorbed libraries 
 National Comics Publications (predecessor)
 All-American Publications  (predecessor)
 Fawcett Comics 
 Quality Comics 
 Charlton Comics 
 Fox Feature Syndicate 
 WildStorm 
 Mad Magazine 
 Milestone 
 DC Comics library 
 Vertigo Comics library 
 DC Black Label library  (successor)
 Amalgam Comics (co-owned with Marvel Comics)
 All-Star 
 Wonder Comics

Streaming & Interactive Entertainment 
 Otter Media
 Fullscreen
 Machinima, Inc.
 Gunpowder and Sky
 Rooster Teeth Productions
 Warner Bros. Interactive Entertainment
 TT Games (with some exceptions)
 Monolith Productions
 Surreal Software
 WB Games
 CN Games
 Adult Swim Games
 Midway Games
 Midway Games West Inc.
 Time Warner Interactive
 Williams Electronics (video games)

Music publishing
 Lorimar Music Publishing, Inc.
 Lorimar Music A Corp. (ASCAP)
 Lorimar Music Bee Corp. (BMI)
 New Line Melodies (SESAC)
 New Line Music Corp. (BMI)
 New Line Tunes (ASCAP)
 T-L Music Publishing Company, Inc.
 Eleven Hundred Music (SESAC)
 L-T Music Publishing (BMI)
 T-L Music Publishing (ASCAP)
 Turner Music Publishing Inc.
 RET Music, Inc. (ASCAP)
 Super Satellite Music (BMI)
 Techwood Music, Inc. (ASCAP)
 Ten Fifty Music, Inc. (BMI)
 Title Match Music, Inc. (SESAC)
 Turner Music Canada, Inc. (SOCAN)
 Warner-Barham Music LLC (BMI)
 Warner-Hollywood Music LLC (SESAC)
 Warner-Olive Music LLC (ASCAP)

See also 
 List of Warner Bros. Discovery television programs
 List of Discovery Channel original programming
 List of Animal Planet original programming
 List of Food Network original programming
 List of Travel Channel original programming
 List of assets owned by Warner Bros. Discovery
 Lists of Warner Bros. films
 List of New Line Cinema films
 List of Castle Rock Entertainment films

References 

library
Warner Bros. Discovery